Achyranthes japonica, commonly known as Oriental chaff flower or Japanese chaff flower, is a perennial member of the genus Achyranthes in the family Amaranthaceae. It can be discovered on the roadside and its main distribution is in Korea and Japan.

Ecology
Stems are glabrous or slightly pubescent and shape quadrangular and branched. Its nodes are dilated. The leaves opposite and shape elliptic or oval and slightly pubescent and have petiolate. Flowers bloom from August to September and inflorescence spikes in axils and at terminals of the stem. From there, tiny green flowers bloom. It has five stamens and a pistil in each flower and unites into one at the bottom. Tiny bracts, branch shaped, easily stick to cloth.

Suitable soils for growth include light (sandy) and medium (loamy) soils. Suitable pH ranges from acidic to neutral soils.
It grows in woody areas in lowlands and hills.

Chemical compounds
The leaves and stems and roots contain several chemical constituents.  The seed contain insect moulting hormones including rubrosterone, ecdysterone, and inokosterone.  The root contains triterpenoids and saponins  In addition, it contains protocatechuic acid.

Traditional medicine
The root of the plant is used in the traditional medicine of Korea.

References 

japonica
Edible plants
Medicinal plants of Asia